The Montgomery Miners were a minor league baseball team based in Montgomery, West Virginia. From 1910 to 1912, the Miners played as members of the 1910 Virginia Valley League and Mountain States League in 1911 and 1912.

History
Montgomery, West Virginia first hosted minor league baseball in 1910. The 1910 Montgomery Miners played as members of the Virginia Valley League. Beginning play on May 5, 1910 in the Class D level league, the Miners finished last, in 6th place, with a 47–63 record. Playing under manager Andy O'Connor, Montgomery finished games 17.5 games behind the 1st place Huntington team. After the 1910 season, the Virginia Valley League permanently folded, but the league essentially changed names for the 1911 season as five members continued play in the new league.

The Montgomery use of the "Miners" nickname corresponds to the local mining industry of the era. In the early 1910s, Montgomery had an extensive railroad yard, which was the shipping center for 26 different coal companies and was the largest town in Fayette County, West Virginia at the time.

The 1911 Montgomery Miners won a controversial championship in the newly named league. The Miners continued play as charter members of 1911 Mountain States League. The Ashland-Catlettsburg Twins, Charleston Senators, Huntington Blue Sox, Ironton Nailers and the Point Pleasant-Gallipolis team joined the Miners as charter members of the six–team Class D level league. The league play began on May 12, 1911.

In the 1911 standings, the Montgomery Miners finished in 1st place with a 67–43 overall record, playing under managers Ralph Fleming and Henry Runser. Montgomery finished ahead of the Huntington 2nd place Blue Sox (63–50), Ashland-Catlettsburg Twins (63–55), Charleston Senators (57–58) and Point Pleasant-Gallipolis/Middleport-Pomeroy (59–60) and Ironton Nailers (44–77) in the overall standings. The league played a split season, with Huntington winning the first half standings and Point Pleasant-Gallipolis/Middleport-Pomeroy winning the second half standings. However, Montgomery had the best overall record and no playoffs were held. The National Association governing body ordered the league not to hold playoffs, after a National Association investigation following the regular season found two cases of improper conduct in late season games that prevented Middleport-Pomeroy from winning the second half title. These games were later deducted at the league's fall meeting. The ruling of no playoffs for the Mountain States League left Montgomery with the best overall record in 1st place overall.

In 1912, Montgomery began their season without a team, despite their successful season in 1911. However, on June 16, 1912, the Montgomery Miners resumed play when the Point Pleasant-Gallipolis/ Middleport-Pomroy franchise, with a 7–21 overall record, moved for a second time, to Montgomery. Montgomery was in 6th place when the franchise permanently disbanded on June 29, 1912, ending their final season with a 10–24 record, while playing under manager Reddy Mack. The entire Mountain States League folded on July 8, 1912.

The Ashland-Catlettsburg Twins of the Mountain States League ended the 1912 season with a record of 26 wins and 19 losses, finishing second in the MSL.Ashland-Catlettsburg and Huntington dropped out July 8, ending the league. James Kitler served as manager.

Montgomery, West Virginia has not hosted another minor league team.

The ballpark
The name of the Montgomery Miners' home minor league ballpark is not referenced.

Timeline

Year–by–year records

Notable alumni

Reddy Mack (1912, MGR)
Andy O'Connor (1910, MGR)

See also
Montgomery Miners players

References

External links
Montgomery - Baseball Reference

Baseball teams established in 1910
Baseball teams disestablished in 1912
Defunct baseball teams in West Virginia
Mountain States League teams
Fayette County, West Virginia
Kanawha County, West Virginia